The Lycoming O-145 is a family of small, low-horsepower, four-cylinder, air-cooled engines. It was Lycoming Engines' first horizontally opposed aircraft engine and was produced from 1938 until the late 1940s. The family includes the reduction-geared GO-145. The O-145 received its Approved Type Certificate on 13 Jun 1938.

Design and development

The "B" model was the major production model, with the "A" and "C" produced in much smaller quantities. 

All models of the series had the same bore, stroke, and displacement, additional horsepower being generated by increasing compression ratio and maximum rpm. All use a Stromberg NA-S2 or NA-S2A or Marvel MA-2 or MA-2-A carburetor. The dual ignition versions use two Scintilla SF-4L, SN4LN-20 or -21, Superior SMA-4 or Edison-Splitdorf RMA-4 magnetos.

The O-145 had a hard time competing with the same horsepower Continentals due to its smaller displacement, which resulted in a steeper torque curve.

The GO-145 is a geared model, introduced in 1938, that uses a 27:17 reduction ratio (1.59:1) gearbox to produce  at 3200 crankshaft rpm, giving 2013 propeller rpm. The engine employs a gearbox bolted to the front of the engine and the resulting engine weighs  without starter or generator. The GO-145 suffered from a poor reputation for reliability, because pilots mis-handled the engine, running it at too low a cruising rpm and causing gearbox wear as a result.

The series' type certificate expired on 2 November 1950 and no O-145-B1 or -C1 or GO-145-C1s engines produced after 1 August 1941 and O-145-B2, -B3 or -C2, or GO-145-C2 or -C3s produced after 24 August 1949 are eligible for certification. The single ignition O-145-A series, O-145-B1, and -C1 are not covered by the original type certificate.

Lycoming ended production of the O-145 and replaced it with the O-235 series.

Variants
O-145-A
Four-cylinder, direct drive, single ignition
O-145-A3
Four-cylinder, direct drive, single ignition, with starter and generator installed

O-145-B1
Four-cylinder, direct drive,  at 2550 rpm, single ignition, 155 lb
O-145-B2
Four-cylinder, direct drive,  at 2550 rpm, dual ignition, 166 lb
O-145-B3
Four-cylinder, direct drive,  at 2550 rpm, dual ignition, 169 lb
O-145-C1
Four-cylinder, direct drive,  at 3100 rpm, single ignition, 155 lb
O-145-C2
Four-cylinder, direct drive,  at 3100 rpm, dual ignition, 166 lb
GO-145-C1
Four-cylinder, reduction gearbox,  at 3200 rpm, single ignition, 182 lb
GO-145-C2
Four-cylinder, reduction gearbox,  at 3200 rpm, dual ignition, 193 lb
GO-145-C3
Four-cylinder, reduction gearbox,  at 3200 rpm, dual ignition, 195 lb

Applications
O-145
Aeronca Chief 50L, 50LA, 65LA
Aeronca Super Chief 65LB
Aeronca Tandem 50TL, 60TL, 65TL
Airdrome Fokker D-VIII
Luscombe 8B
Mooney Mite M-18L
Piper J-3L Cub, most often the 65 hp version
Piper J-4F Cub Coupe
Piper PA-8 Skycycle
Carlson Skycycle
Piper PA-15 Vagabond
Porterfield Collegiate LP-50, LP-55, LP-65
Taylorcraft BL series (BL-50, BL-65, BL-12-65, etc.)
Taylorcraft DL
Taylorcraft Plus C
GO-145
Piper J-5B Cub Cruiser
Funk B75L
General Skyfarer
Rich Twin 1-X-2
Shirlen Big Cootie
Stinson 10B Voyager

Specifications (GO-145-C2)

See also

References

O-145
1930s aircraft piston engines